Bigbee Valley is an unincorporated community in Noxubee County, Mississippi, United States.  Variant names are "Bigbeevale", "Nances Mill", and "Whitehall".

The hamlet was historically located near the west bank of the Tombigbee River.

The community derives its name from the last two syllables of "Tombigbee", a name of Choctaw origin. A post office was established in 1858.

By 1900, Bigbee Valley had a grist mill, a steam saw mill, cotton gins, and a population of 75.

References

Unincorporated communities in Noxubee County, Mississippi
Unincorporated communities in Mississippi
Mississippi placenames of Native American origin